Hy is a dialect of the Lisp programming language designed to interact with Python by translating s-expressions into Python's abstract syntax tree (AST). Hy was introduced at Python Conference (PyCon) 2013 by Paul Tagliamonte. Lisp allows operating on code as data (metaprogramming), thus Hy can be used to write domain-specific languages.

Similar to Kawa's and Clojure's mappings onto the Java virtual machine (JVM), Hy is meant to operate as a transparent Lisp front-end for Python. It allows Python libraries, including the standard library, to be imported and accessed alongside Hy code with a compiling step where both languages are converted into Python's AST.

Example code 
From the language documentation:
=> (print "Hy!")
Hy!
=> (defn salutationsnm [name] (print (+ "Hy " name "!")))
=> (salutationsnm "YourName")
Hy YourName!

See also 
 Common Lisp
 Clojure
 Kawa (Scheme implementation)
 CLPython

Notes

References

External links 
 
 
 Documentation
 Video of 2014 PyCon talk

Lisp (programming language)
Cross-platform free software
Lisp programming language family
Programming languages created in 2013